Paul Mackie (born 8 November 1963) is a Scottish former professional footballer who played as a right winger.

Career
Born in Glasgow, Mackie began his career at Kilsyth St. Patrick's, before playing in the Scottish Football League for Alloa Athletic and Stenhousemuir.

He also played for Rutherglen Glencairn.

References

1963 births
Living people
Scottish footballers
Alloa Athletic F.C. players
Stenhousemuir F.C. players
Rutherglen Glencairn F.C. players
Scottish Football League players
Association football wingers